Isaac Stearns (February 25, 1598 – June 19, 1671) was an English emigrant who, on April 8, 1630, embarked from Yarmouth, England, aboard the ship Arbella. He was among the original settlers of the Massachusetts Bay Colony. Stearns was born c. 1598. He worked as a tailor and married Mary Barker (c. 1604–77) on May 20, 1622, with whom he fathered eight children. His pedigree is unknown, and it is uncertain from where in England he came, but his wife was from the parish of Nayland, in Suffolk, and their first three children were born there.

The Arbella arrived in Salem, Massachusetts, on June 12, 1630, but the passengers disliked the location as a place for a permanent settlement, so they proceeded to Charlestown and were among the first settlers of Watertown, near Mount Auburn, Massachusetts. Stearns was declared a freeman on May 18, 1631; he was elected to the area's Board of selectmen several years later. In 1647, Stearns was appointed by the community's selectmen to plan a bridge over the Charles River. This is the first mention of a bridge over the Charles River at Watertown.

Isaac was accompanied on the Arbella by a brother, Shubael Stearns, who died, leaving his children to Isaac's care, but the records are unclear which children belonged to whom. Isaac is thought to be the first American ancestor of the Massachusetts Stearns. Every attempt to trace the Stearns lineage in the United States has led back to him, or to Charles or Nathaniel Stearns, men believed to have either been Isaac's brothers or nephews. Notable descendants of Isaac Stearns include Richard Nixon and T. S. Eliot.

Isaac Stearns died on June 19, 1671.

References

Bibliography 

1598 births
1671 deaths
Kingdom of England emigrants to Massachusetts Bay Colony
People from Watertown, Massachusetts
People of colonial Massachusetts
People from Nayland